The 27th Annual South African Music Awards were the 27th edition of the South African Music Awards. The award show was broadcast live on SABC 1 on July 31, 2021 and was held virtually due to the effects of COVID-19 lockdowns.

The nominees were announced on 19 May 2021. Kabza De Small received the most nominations with six, ahead of Sun-El Musician with five nominations. The 27th annual SAMAs introduced new categories, introducing best amapiano, gqom and kwaito albums as their own categories.

On 17 July 2021, it was announced that television personalities Bontle Modiselle and Lawrence Maleka were to be the hosts of the ceremony.

Performers 
The list of performers was announced on July 28.

Winners and nominees
Nominees are as listed below. Winners are in bold. 
{| class=wikitable
|-
! style="background:#EEDD85; width=50%" | Album of the year
! style="background:#EEDD85; width=50%" | Female Artist of the Year
! style="background:#EEDD85; width=50%" | Male Artist of the Year
|-

| valign="top" |
Once Upon A Time in Lockdown – Kabza De Small & DJ Maphorisa (Scorpion Kings)Persistence – Bongo RiotThe Healers: The Last Chapter – Black MotionI Am The King of Amapiano: Sweet & Dust – Kabza De SmallBack to Love – Junior Taurus
| valign="top" |
Sho Madjozi – What a Life
Reign Africa – On the Frontline 
Bucy Radebe – Spiritual Encounter 
Nomcebo Zikode – Xola Moya Wam’ 
HLE – Your Kingdom on Earth
| valign="top" |
Kabza De Small – I Am the King of Amapiano: Sweet & Dust
Sun-El Musician – To The World & Beyond 
Bongo Riot – Persistence 
Oscar Mbo – For the Groovists 
Junior Taurus – Back to Love
|-
! style="background:#EEDD85; width=50%" | Newcomer of the Year
! style="background:#EEDD85; width=50%" | Duo/Group of the Year
! style="background:#EEDD85; width=50%" | Best Rock Album
! style="background:#EEDD85; width=50%" | Best Pop Album
|-

| valign="top" |
Bucy Radebe – Spiritual Encounter
Xolly Mncwango – Jesus is Enough 
Reign Africa – On the Frontline 
BandaBanda & The Crocodiles – Africado 
Azana – Ingoma 

| valign="top" |
Kabza De Small & DJ Maphorisa (Scorpion Kings)  – Once Upon A Time in Lockdown
Reece Madlisa & Zuma – Ama Roto EP 
MFR Souls – Musical Kings 
Mas Musiq & Aymos – Shonamalanga 
Mi Casa – We Made It 

| valign="top" |
 Orange Sunshine – Yum YuckChrome Neon Jesus – Ethyl Ether
Here’s to the Now – Nathan Smith
The Devils Cattle – Ruff Majik
Nothing’s Gonna Change – Oooth

| valign="top" |Tribes & Angels – Locnville11:11 – Rowlene
I Don’t Sleep – Jethro Tait
Sugar – Mark Stent
She – Amy Lilley

|-
! style="background:#EEDD85; width=50%" | Best Pop Album
! style="background:#EEDD85; width=50%" | Best Afro Pop Album
! style="background:#EEDD85; width=50%" | Best R&B/Soul Album
! style="background:#EEDD85; width=50%" | Best Adult Contemporary Album
|-

| valign="top" |Twintig20 – Brendan Peyper2021 – Die Heuwels Fantasties
Die Toekoms is Synth – Synth Peter
Gewigloos – Juan Boucher
Gemaklik Verlore – Christa Visser

| valign="top" |Ngumama – Vusi NovaIngoma – Azana
Molimo – Manu Worldstar
The Voice of Africa – Kelly Khumalo
Tugela Fairy: Made of Stars – Simmy

| valign="top" |Uhambo – Soul KultureA Force To Be Reckoned With – Thando
LANGA – Langa Mavuso
Sindisiwe – LaSauce
Small World – Ricky Tyler

| valign="top" |Beyele - The Journey Continues – Max – HobaUmsebenzi – Sjava
Isambulo – 1020 Cartel Artists
Bamako – Simphiwe Dana
Buhlebendalo – Chosi

|-
! style="background:#EEDD85; width=50%" | Best Classical Album/Instrumental Album
! style="background:#EEDD85; width=50%" | Best Contemporary Music Album
! style="background:#EEDD85; width=50%" | Best Hip Hop Album
! style="background:#EEDD85; width=50%" | Best Reggae Album
|-

| valign="top" |We’ve Known All Times – Wouter KellermanLive in Cape Town – Guy Buttery & Derek Gripper
Imagine – Charles du Plessis Trio
Live in Lisbon – Nibs van der Spuy and Guy Buttery
Tek’o – CH2

| valign="top" |Herverbeel – Die Heuwels FantastiesWandel in my Woning – Refentse
Net Geleen – Bernice West
Monumentaal – Ruhan Du Toit
Spontaan – Riaan Benadê

| valign="top" |Zulu Man with Some Power – Nasty C4436 – Boity
Nadia Naked II – Nadia Nakai
POPSTAR – Yanga Chief
Zakwe & Duncan – Zakwe & Duncan

| valign="top" |Persistence – Bongo RiotThe Journey – Ras Canly
My Music – Freeky
On the Frontline – Reign Africa
Empathy Riddim – Lavoro Duro

|-
! style="background:#EEDD85; width=50%" | Remix of the Year
! style="background:#EEDD85; width=50%" | Best Collaboration
! style="background:#EEDD85; width=50%" | Best Dance Album
! style="background:#EEDD85; width=50%" | Best Kwaito
|-

| valign="top" |"Yehla Moya" – Da Capo"Jerusalema" – Kid Fonque
"Ndanele" – Dwson
"Sala Nabani" – Sun-El Musician, Claudio & Kenza
"Speak Lord" – Sculptured Music

| valign="top" |"Mali Eningi" – Big Zulu featuring Riky Rick & Intaba Yase Dubai"Uthando" – Darque featuring Zakes Bantwini
"Ek Like Hoe Jy Dans" – Chê featuring Snotkop
"Senzeni" – Mthandazo Gatya featuring Comado & DJ Manzo SA
"Yehla Moya" – Da Capo & Nduduzo Makhathini featuring Omagugu

| valign="top" |The Healers: The Last Chapter – Black MotionTo The World & Beyond – Sun-El Musician
For The Goovists – Oscar Mbo
Xola Moya Wam’ – Nomcebo Zikode
We Made It – Mi Casa

| valign="top" |Ama Roto EP – Reece Madlisa & ZumaSgubhu OverDoze – Lvovo & Danger
Endaweni – Darkie Fiction
Don’t Lose Hope – Sukiri Papa
Bhut’Madlisa – Mampintsha

|-
! style="background:#EEDD85; width=50%" | Best Amapiano Album
! style="background:#EEDD85; width=50%" | Best Gqom Album
! style="background:#EEDD85; width=50%" | Best Engineered Album of the Year
! style="background:#EEDD85; width=50%" | Best Produced Music Video
|-
| valign="top" |Once Upon A Time In Lockdown – Kabza De Small & DJ Maphorisa (Scorpion Kings)Musical Kings – MFR Souls
Back to Love – Junior Taurus
I Am The King of Amapiano: Sweet & Dust – Kabza De Small
Shonamalanga – Mas Musiq & Aymos

| valign="top" |
 InzaloYekwaito – ZinaroWe Don’t Play the Same Gqom – Que
Make Cape Town Great Again – Mshayi & Mr Thela
Isiqalo – DragerNation
Idando Kazi – Babes Wodumo

| valign="top" |
 Inganekwane by Zoë Modiga – Papi Diretsi & Songo OyamaSwingle Bells by Jonathan Roxmouth – Adam Howard
Goodluck Upclose by Goodluck – Murray Anderson & Andrew Rawborn
Isambulo by 1020 Cartel Artists – Mfanafuthi Ruff
The Second Coming by Kid Tini – James Smals, Kitie, Ron Epidemic & Tweezy

| valign="top" |"Hosh" by Prince Kaybee featuring Sir Trill – Ofentse"Where is the DJ" by Malumz on Decks featuring Khanyisa – Oscar Nyathi
"Qhawe – Made to Create" by Toya Delazy – Kyle Lewis & Vjorn Tucker
"Mamela" by Mi Casa – Katya Abedian
"Lucky Star" by K.O – Adam Zackon & Dale Fortune

|-
! style="background:#EEDD85; width=50%" | Best Live Audio Visual Recording
! style="background:#EEDD85; width=50%" | Best Alternative Music Album
! style="background:#EEDD85; width=50%" | Best African Indigenous Faith Album
! style="background:#EEDD85; width=50%" | Best Traditional Faith Music Album
|-
| valign="top" |A Journey to the World & Beyond – Sun-El MusicianYour Kingdom on Earth – HLE
The Throne (Live Edition) – Presss
Spiritual Encounter – Bucy Radebe
My Hart Klop Refentse – Refentse

| valign="top" |iimini – Bongeziwe MabandlaMania/Post Mania – Yellow House
Hot Mess – Evert Snyman
Filth and Wisdom – The Medicine Dolls
Ebusuku – Th&o

| valign="top" |Izwi Lakho – Mandlethu Gospel SingersMakhosi Akithi – Vuma Zion
Katlehong Gospel Choir Artist Development – Katlehong Gospel Choir Artist Development
Sithembe Wena Nkosi – JTG Gospel Choir
Enyokumkhonza – Enyonini Mission Ministries

| valign="top" |Spiritual Encounter – Bucy RadebeProject 17 – Chapter 2 – Worship House
Buya Nkosi – Thinah Zungu
Wathi Eloyi Eloyi – Sipho Makhabane
Izulu – Sneziey
|-
! style="background:#EEDD85; width=50%" | Best Contemporary Faith Music Album
! style="background:#EEDD85; width=50%" | Best Maskandi Album
! style="background:#EEDD85; width=50%" | Rest of Africa Artist
! style="background:#EEDD85; width=50%" | Best Traditional Album
|-

| valign="top" |Your Kingdom on Earth – HLEDevotion – Nqubeko Mbatha
Face 2 Face – Collen Maluleke
Jesus is Enough – Xolly Mncwango
The Promised Revival Part One – Tshwane Gospel Choir

| valign="top" |Imfene Kamakhelwane – Abafana Baka MgqumeniAmagupta – iChwane Lebhaca
Ziyangiluma Izinja – Phuzekhemisi
Iqatha Eliziqobayo – Thokozani Langa
Banathi Shaqa – Imithente

| valign="top" |Songs in the Key of Love – BeritaUnity Album – Buffalo Souljah
A Better Time – Davido
Made in Lagos – Wizkid
Midnight Train – Sauti Sol

| valign="top" |What a Life'' – Sho MadjoziLove and War – Henny C
Angeke Bakuthande Boke – Smangele
Shebeen Queen – Vusi Mahlasela
Ndavhuko – Vendaboy Poe
|}

Artist Of The Year Top 5
1. Makhadzi
2. Ethyl Ether
3. Blaq Diamond
4. Reece Madlisa and Zuma
5. HLE

CAPASSO Most Streamed Song of The Year
You're the One - Elaine

Best Adult Contemporary Album:

Winner:
Ndlovu Youth Choir - Rise

Artist Of The Year Top 3
1. HLE
2. Makhadzi
3. Blaq Diamond

Best Jazz Album:

Winner:
Modes of Communication: Letters from the Underworlds - Nduduzo Makhathini
Best Produced Album:

Winner:
Sjava - Umsebenzi (Delaydem, Ruff Nkosi, Webmoms, Zadok & Vuyo Manyike)

Music Video of the Year:
MFR Souls - Amanikiniki ft. Major League DJz, Kamo Mphela, Bontle Smith
Prince Kaybee - uWrongo ft. Black Motion, Shimza, Ami Faku
Sha Sha - Tender Love ft. DJ Maphorisa & Kabza De Small
Miss Pru - Price To Pay ft. Blaq Diamond, Malome Vector
Master KG - Jerusalema ft. Nomcebo Zikode
Ayanda Jiya - Lover 4 Life ft. Stogie T (Music Video)
Malome Vector - Dumelang ft. Blaq Diamond (Music Video)
Semi Tee - Gabadiya ft. Kammu Dee, Miano (Official Video)
Aubrey Qwana - Molo (Official Music Video) #REMASTEREDINHD
Nasty C - There They Go
Kwesta - Njandini
Elaine - You're the One (Official Music Video) REMASTERED
DJ Maphorisa, Kabza De Small - Lorch ft. Semi Tee, Miano, Kammu Dee
TNS, Skillz - Ayabonga ft. LeSoul (Official Music Video) HD
Sphectacula, DJ Naves - Okokoko ft. Thebe, Unathi (Video)
Nasty C - Eazy (Official Music Video) #REMASTEREDINHD
Focalistic - Ke Star ft. Vigro Deep (Official Video)
Rouge - One By One ft. AKA
Azana - Your Love (Official Music Video) REMASTERED
Shane Eagle - Paris ft. Nasty C (Music Video)

Winner:
Miss Pru - Price to Pay ft. Blaq Diamond, Malome Vector

Record of the Year:
Master KG - Jerusalema ft. Nomcebo Zikode
Elaine - You're the One
Kabza De Small, DJ Maphorisa - eMcimbini (Audio)
Nomcebo Zikode - Xola Moya Wam' ft. Master KG
Blaq Diamond - Love Letter (Official Audio) 2020
Aubrey Qwana - Molo (Official Audio) 2020 Lyrics On Screen
Sun-El Musician - Ubomi Abumanga ft. Msaki (Audio)
Prince Kaybee, Black Motion, Shimza, Ami Faku - uWrongo
Kelly Khumalo - Empini (Official Audio) 2020 Lyrics
MFR Souls - Amanikiniki ft. Major League DJz, Kamo Mphela, Bontle Smith
Sha Sha - Tender Love ft. DJ Maphorisa, Kabza De Small
Miss Pru - Price To Pay ft. Blaq Diamond, Malome Vector
TNS - Umona ft. Mpumi (Official Audio) 2019 Lyric Video
Matthew Mole - Keep It Together (Official Audio) 2020 Lyric
Simmy - Ngihamba Nawe ft. Sino Msolo (Official Audio) 2021
Blaq Diamond - SummerYoMuthi (Official Audio) 2020
MFR Souls - Love You Tonight ft. Kabza De Small, DJ Maphorisa, Sha Sha
Jethro Tait - Sad
Shekhinah - Fixate ft. Bey T (Audio)
Azana - Your Love (Official Audio)

Winner:
Matthew Mole - Keep It Together (Official Audio) 2020 Lyric

Artist of the Year:

Winner:
Blaq Diamond

Special AwardsInternational Achievement AwardMaster KGLifetime Achievement AwardLebo M.
Dr Lindelani Mkhize 
PJ Powers

 Best singer in intertainment industry 
Sir trillBest Selling Artist Mlindo the Vocalist - Emakhaya SAMRO HIGHEST AIRPLAY AWARD'''

 Kgaugelo Moagi (Master KG) and Nomcebo Zikode – Jerusalema

References

2021 music awards
South African Music Awards
Impact of the COVID-19 pandemic on the music industry